Kemal Küçükbay (born 23 August 1982 in Sivas, Turkey) is a Turkish former road cyclist. He participated in the men's road race at the 2012 Summer Olympics.

Major results

2005
 1st  Road race, National Road Championships
 7th Overall Kerman Tour
 9th Overall Presidential Cycling Tour of Turkey
2006
 1st Stage 10 Tour du Cameroun
 6th Overall Presidential Cycling Tour of Turkey
2007
 10th Overall Kerman Tour
2008
 National Road Championships
1st  Time trial
3rd Road race
 8th Overall Tour d'Egypte
 8th Overall Tour of Szeklerland
2009
 2nd  Road race, Balkan Road Championships
 4th Overall Tour du Maroc
2010
 1st  Time trial, National Road Championships
 1st Overall Tour of Marmara
1st Stage 1
 1st Stage 2 Tour of Trakya
 2nd Overall Tour of Alanya
2011
 National Road Championships
1st  Road race
3rd Time trial
 2nd Overall Tour of Trakya
1st Stage 3
 10th Overall Tour of Cappadocia
2012
 10th Overall Tour of Trakya
 10th Grand Prix Dobrich II
2015
 4th Overall Tour of Black Sea
 7th Overall International Tour of Torku Mevlana
2018
 3rd Overall Tour of Mesopotamia

References

External links

Turkish male cyclists
Living people
1982 births
People from Sivas
Cyclists at the 2012 Summer Olympics
Olympic cyclists of Turkey
21st-century Turkish people